The 2004-05 Azerbaijan Top League was the thirteenth season of the Top League since its establishment in 1992. The season began on 7 August 2004 and finished on 24 May 2005. Neftchi Baku were the defending champions, having won the previous season, and they retained the title after defeating Khazar Lankaran in a playoff after both teams finished level on points and goal difference.

Teams

Stadia and locations

League table

Results

Championship play-off

Season statistics

Top scorers

Hat-tricks
 

 4 Player scored 4 goals

References

External links
Azerbaijan 2004-05 RSSSF

Azerbaijan Premier League seasons
Azer
1